Bakhti Belaïb (Arabic: بختي بلعايب) (August 22, 1953 – January 26, 2017) was an Algerian politician. He was born in Théniet El Had and educated at the Lycée Ferroukhi in Miliana. He served as the Algerian Ministry of Trade in 1982, and served as its Minister twice. He died of cancer in Paris, France.

References

1953 births
2017 deaths
Algerian politicians
20th-century Algerian politicians
Deaths from cancer in Algeria
21st-century Algerian people